Neptune may refer to a number of ships named for Neptune, the god of freshwater and the sea in Roman mythology.

Warships
 , any of several Royal Navy warships
 , any of several French Navy warships
 , any of several Spanish Navy warships
 , any of several United States Navy warships

Merchant ships
 , unknown tonnage, that made numerous passenger and supply passages from Europe to the colonial Americas under Captain Waire (also spelled Captain Ware in some records).
 , an 809-ton (bm) merchantman built in 1779, that was part of the Second Fleet
 , a 218-ton (bm) merchantman built in 1778 in America that made one voyage as a whaler and that was last listed in 1803.
 , a 1468-ton (bm) East Indiaman that made eight voyages for the British East India Company (EIC)
  was the first ship built in Quebec after the British occupation. She sailed to England where she became a West Indiaman. A French privateer captured her in 1809.
  was launched as a West Indiaman. A French privateer captured her in 1809 but passengers and some disaffected members of the prize crew recaptured her. She returned to the West Indies trade and foundered on 4 February 1825, while returning to Liverpool from New Orleans.
 , of 554/5 tons (bm) and 126', was built by John Munn.
 , a 477-ton (bm) merchantman built in 1810. She made two voyages transporting convicts to Australia before she was broken up at Cape Town after being condemned as unseaworthy.
  made one voyage for the EIC, and later two voyages transporting convicts to Van Diemen's Land.
  made one voyage transporting convicts to New South Wales. Last listed 1845.
 , was a Dumbarton-built passenger ship on St Petersburg-Cronstadt ferry service
 , a Clyde passenger steamer that became a Civil War blockade runner and was later USS Clyde

See also
 Neptun (ship)
 Neptuno (ship)

References
https://www.brumbaughwise.com/history/neptune-ship-1754
Ship names